A Cold Piece of Work is an album by American rapper Jay Tee, from N2Deep/Latino Velvet.

Track listing

Citations

External links
 A Cold Piece of Work at Discogs

Jay Tee albums
2005 albums